The 1974 Lafayette Leopards football team was an American football team that represented Lafayette College as an independent during the 1974 NCAA Division II football season.

In their fourth year under head coach Neil Putnam, the Leopards compiled a 3–7 record. Adam Piergallini and Michael Slattery were the team captains.

Lafayette played its home games at Fisher Field on College Hill in Easton, Pennsylvania.

Schedule

References

Lafayette
Lafayette Leopards football seasons
Lafayette Leopards football